Revolution's Orphans is a 1979 Canadian short film, produced by the National Film Board of Canada and directed by John N. Smith. It is about a man who flees Hungary, with his daughter Clara, for Canada as the 1956 Hungarian Revolution happens. They feel regret for abandoning their homeland—until Clara's uncle Janos arrives.

The film won the Bronze Hugo, Short Subject-Drama at the 1979 Chicago International Film Festival. It earned  six Genie Award nominations; Rudi Lipp won the Genie Award for Outstanding Performance by an Actor (Non-Feature).

References

External links

1979 films
Quebec films
1970s English-language films
National Film Board of Canada short films
Films directed by John N. Smith
Canadian drama short films
Hungarian Revolution of 1956 films
1970s Canadian films